is a Japanese sailor. He competed in the men's 470 event at the 1992 Summer Olympics.

References

External links
 

1961 births
Living people
Japanese male sailors (sport)
Olympic sailors of Japan
Sailors at the 1992 Summer Olympics – 470
Place of birth missing (living people)